Dmitri Vladimirovich Kombarov (born 22 January 1987) is a Russian football coach and a former player who played as a left midfielder or a left back. He is the manager of Zvezda St. Petersburg. He is an identical twin brother of Kirill Kombarov. Known for his technical skills and pace, he played as an attack minded left back.

Career

Dynamo Moscow
Dmitri started playing football at the age of 4. In 1993, Dmitri and his twin brother Kirill joined the Spartak Moscow football academy. After a conflict with the school coaches, the brothers left Spartak and joined the Dynamo Moscow academy.

Dmitri made his first appearance for the main squad of Dynamo on 13 July 2005 in a Russian Cup game against Dynamo Bryansk.

FC Spartak Moscow
In August 2010, the Kombarov brothers left Dynamo Moscow for their city rivals Spartak Moscow where they started their football education. Despite being a left defender, at the end of the 2012-13 season he finished as the top scorer of the team with 7 goals.

On 19 June 2019, he was released from his Spartak contract by mutual consent.

Krylia Sovetov Samara
On 9 July 2019, Russian Premier League club PFC Krylia Sovetov Samara confirmed that Kombarov will join the squad for the 2019–20 season.

International career
His first appearance in Russia national football team was in February 2012, in the friendly match with Denmark.
He was confirmed for the finalized UEFA Euro 2012 squad on 25 May 2012. He scored his first international goal in a friendly match against Armenia on 5 March 2014.
On 2 June 2014, he was included in the Russia's 2014 FIFA World Cup squad.

He scored his first competitive goal for Russia against Liechtenstein in a 2016 European Championship qualification match.

On 11 May 2018, he was included in Russia's extended 2018 FIFA World Cup squad as a back-up. He was not included in the finalized World Cup squad.

International goals

Career statistics

Honours
Spartak Moscow
Russian Premier League: 2016-17
Russian Super Cup: 2017

Individual
 List of 33 top players of the Russian league: #2 (2013/14).

References

1987 births
Living people
Russian footballers
Russia under-21 international footballers
Russia national football B team footballers
Russia international footballers
Association football defenders
FC Dynamo Moscow players
Russian twins
Russian Premier League players
Footballers from Moscow
FC Spartak Moscow players
PFC Krylia Sovetov Samara players
Twin sportspeople
UEFA Euro 2012 players
2014 FIFA World Cup players
UEFA Euro 2016 players
2017 FIFA Confederations Cup players
Russian football managers